The Latimer School (also known as "The School House Apartments") in the East Allegheny neighborhood of Pittsburgh, Pennsylvania, is a building from 1898. It is a massive 4 story yellow brick building with a variety of window types and placement. The school was closed in 1974 because there was no outdoor play area.  It was purchased for conversion into apartments in 1984.

It was designed by the German-born Pittsburgh architect Frederick C. Sauer (1860-1942)

The school building was listed on the National Register of Historic Places in 1986.

References

Neoclassical architecture in Pennsylvania
School buildings completed in 1898
Schools in Pittsburgh
School buildings on the National Register of Historic Places in Pennsylvania
National Register of Historic Places in Pittsburgh
Apartment buildings in Pittsburgh